The Anomoeotidae are a family of moths in the order Lepidoptera of about 40 species, with  Afrotropical and Oriental distribution.

Genera
 Akesina
 Anomoeotes
 Dianeura
 Staphylinochrous
 Thermochrous

References

 
Moth families